Quick City is an unincorporated community in southwestern Johnson County, in the U.S. state of Missouri.

History
Quick City was platted in 1886 by Morris Quick, and named for him. A post office called Quick City was established in 1886, and remained in operation until 1967.

References

Unincorporated communities in Johnson County, Missouri
Unincorporated communities in Missouri